Princess Isabelle  may refer to:

 Princess Isabelle of Orléans-Braganza (1911–2003), Countess of Paris
 Princess Isabelle of Orléans (1878–1961) (1878–1961), a member of the French Orleanist royal family
 Princess Isabelle of Orléans (1900–1983) (1900–1983)
 Princess Isabelle of Liechtenstein, a member of the Family of Liechtenstein
 Princess Isabelle of Salm-Salm (1903–2009)

See also
 Princess Marie Isabelle of Liechtenstein (born 1959), wife of Prince Gundakar of Liechtenstein
 Princess Isabella (disambiguation)
 Queen Isabella (disambiguation)